The Vodafone MTV Australia Awards 2009 is the fifth annual MTV Awards show from MTV Australia. The Awards were held on 27 March 2009 at the Sydney Convention and Exhibition Centre, Darling Harbour, Sydney.

Background information
The show's air date was originally announced on 16 February 2009 and the nominees for the show were announced on 19 February 2009. The awards show will be produced by American producer Alex Coletti who produced the 2003 MTV Video Music Awards. It was announced on 22 February 2009 that Fall Out Boy band member Pete Wentz would host the event. The public will vote for the winners of all eight categories with the voting commencing on 23 February and concluding on 25 March. The show will be broadcast on MTV World Stage around the world.
On the show special appearances were made by Vanilla Ice, Ashlee Simpson and Wolfmother.

Performers
The Killers
Kings of Leon (Live via satellite from TSB Bank Arena, Wellington, New Zealand)
Sia
The Fray
Jessica Mauboy
Kaiser Chiefs (red carpet)
Wolfmother

Presenters
Audrina Patridge (red carpet)
Lara Bingle 
Rhys Darby
Dannii Minogue
Duffy
Mark Hoppus
Delta Goodrem
Estella Warren
Vanilla Ice
Robbie Maddison

Winners and nominees

The winners are in bold.

References

MTV Australia Awards
2009 music awards
2009 in Australian music
2000s in Sydney